Judge Claude Frollo is a fictional character and the main antagonist of Disney's 1996 animated film version of The Hunchback of Notre Dame. He was based on Archdeacon Claude Frollo from Victor Hugo's 1831 novel.

Frollo is ranked one of the greatest villains in the Disney Renaissance, and widely regarded one of the darkest animated film villains in the history of Disney animated films.

Personality 
Frollo is portrayed in the film as the ruthless, fanatically religious French Minister of Justice. He views the world and everyone in it (except for himself) as corrupt and sinful, and reserves particular hatred for Paris' Romani population, whom he longs to exterminate. Like his original character in Hugo's novel, Frollo lusts after the Romani girl Esmeralda to the point of obsession, and resolves that she will submit to him or die. Frollo believes everything he does is in accordance with God's will, despite his hypocrisy in lusting after Esmeralda and his cruelty to her people.

Director Gary Trousdale described the film's Frollo as "a horrible, horrible person", while Tony Jay, who voiced him, compared him to Hannibal Lecter in The Silence of the Lambs.

Appearances

The Hunchback of Notre Dame 
In the film, Frollo and his soldiers capture a group of Romani people (to which the Parisian citizens called them "gypsies") attempting to immigrate to Paris on a boat. A Roma woman in the group attempts to flee with her deformed baby, but Frollo kills her outside Notre Dame Cathedral. He tries to kill the baby as well by throwing it into a well to drown, but the cathedral's archdeacon intervenes and accuses Frollo of murdering an innocent woman. Fearing divine retribution, Frollo reluctantly agrees to raise the deformed child in Notre Dame as his son, to atone for his sin and in the hope that the hunchback will someday be useful to him. He names the child "Quasimodo", and teaches him that the world outside the cathedral is a sinful place full of people who would hate and shun him for his deformity.

Twenty years later, in the Palace of Justice, Frollo appoints a new Captain of the Guard, Phoebus, stating his intent to eradicate the city's Gypsy population by discovering their sanctuary, the "Court of Miracles". While attending the annual Festival of Fools, Frollo discovers a Romani dancer, Esmeralda, who dances in front of him and kisses him on the nose. He finds that Quasimodo has left the bell tower and joined the Festival. Quasimodo is humiliated by the crowd after two of Frollo's guards start a riot. Frollo refuses to help Quasimodo, going so far as to refuse Phoebus' request to stop the cruelty, until Esmeralda defiantly frees Quasimodo. Esmeralda berates Frollo for refusing to help Quasimodo, as well as his cruel treatment of travelers and other outcasts, and uses a magic trick to evade arrest. Phoebus refuses to arrest her for witchcraft inside Notre Dame and instead tells Frollo that she has claimed sanctuary inside the cathedral; the archdeacon orders Frollo and his men out.

Frollo soon develops lustful feelings for Esmeralda and, through song, begs the Virgin Mary to save him from her "spell"; he then resolves that she will be his, or she will die, asking God to have mercy on both of them. When Frollo learns that Esmeralda has escaped Notre Dame, he instigates a citywide manhunt for her, capturing and bribing Romani and burning countless houses in his way. Phoebus is appalled by Frollo's actions and openly defies him, and Frollo furiously orders him executed as punishment for his defiance. While fleeing, Phoebus is struck by an arrow and falls into the River Seine, but Esmeralda rescues him and takes him to Notre Dame for refuge.

Realizing that Quasimodo helped Esmeralda escape, Frollo returns to Notre Dame and lies to him, saying that he knows where the Court of Miracles is and will attack it. Following Quasimodo and Phoebus to the Court of Miracles, Frollo and his men capture all the Roma present. Frollo prepares to have Esmeralda burned at the stake, but offers to spare her life if she submits to his desires. A disgusted Esmeralda rejects his advances, and Frollo prepares to execute her. Quasimodo rescues her, however, and brings her to the cathedral. Frollo furiously orders his soldiers to seize the cathedral, even going as far as ignoring the archdeacon's pleas for him to stop. Phoebus releases the travellers, rallying the citizens of Paris against Frollo and his men, and Quasimodo pours molten lead onto the streets. Frollo escapes into the cathedral and pursues Quasimodo and Esmeralda to the balcony, where he climbs onto a gargoyle and raises his sword to strike at Esmeralda and Quasimodo, but the gargoyle crumbles underneath him, causing him to lose his balance. In a vision, Frollo sees the gargoyle's demonic face come to life and snarl at him. The gargoyle then breaks off entirely, sending a terrified Frollo falling to his death into the molten lead.

Other appearances 
Frollo has recurring cameo appearances in the animated television series House of Mouse, as one of the guests in the titular club.

In the Kingdom Hearts series, Frollo appears in the video game Kingdom Hearts 3D: Dream Drop Distance, serving as the main antagonist in the La Cité des Cloches world, having the same role as in The Hunchback of Notre Dame.

Claude Frollo appears in the video game Disney Magic Kingdoms as a playable character to unlock for a limited time.

Development 
Frollo was voiced by Tony Jay, whom directors Kirk Wise and Gary Trousdale chose for the role based on his brief appearance as Monsieur D'Arque in their previous film, Beauty and the Beast (1991), and animated by Kathy Zielinski. Features of the character were inspired by the actor Stewart Granger and Hans Conried, especially the latter's appearance in the 1953 film The 5,000 Fingers of Dr. T. The film's producer, Don Hahn, stated that the character of Frollo was inspired by Ralph Fiennes' performance in Schindler's List as Amon Göth, a Nazi who hates and murders Jews, yet desires his Jewish maid. Screenwriter Tab Murphy made Frollo Paris' justice minister rather than an archdeacon, thus avoiding religious sensibilities in the finished film.

References 

Disney animated villains
Fictional dictators
Fictional French people
Fictional mass murderers
Animated characters introduced in 1996
Male characters in animated films
Narcissism in fiction
The Hunchback of Notre Dame (franchise)
Film characters introduced in 1996
Fictional judges
Walt Disney Animation Studios characters
Male film villains